Caroní FC is a professional football club based in Ciudad Guayana, Venezuela. It was founded in 2009 and played in the Venezuelan 1st division in 2010–11 but finished in last position and were relegated. They play at the Polideportivo Cachamay.

References

External links
Soccerway Profile

Association football clubs established in 2009
Football clubs in Venezuela
2009 establishments in Venezuela
Ciudad Guayana